Asahi Metal Industry Co. v. Superior Court, 480 U.S. 102 (1987), decided on February 24, 1987, was a case decided by the United States Supreme Court, in which the court decided whether a foreign corporation, by merely being aware that its products could end up in the forum state and into the American "stream of commerce" which later caused injuries, satisfied the minimum contact necessary to satisfy jurisdictional due process requirements. The court was unanimous in the result, but issued a fractured decision with Associate Justice Sandra Day O'Connor writing for a plurality of the court.

Facts
Asahi Metal Industry Co. was an international corporation based in Japan, which manufactured a valve used in the manufacture of motorcycle wheels. These valves were bought by Cheng Shin Rubber Industrial Co., a Taiwanese distributor. One of these valves was alleged to have failed, causing an accident in California. As a result of the accident the driver of the motorcycle sustained serious injuries and his wife, who was riding on the motorcycle as a passenger, was killed. The accident victim sued Cheng Shin in a California state court, and Cheng Shin in turn filed a third-party complaint (impleader) seeking indemnification from Asahi. Asahi contested California's personal jurisdiction over Asahi, but the California courts found jurisdiction based on Asahi's alleged awareness of the international distribution of its products. Specifically, Asahi moved to quash Cheng Shin's summons. The California Superior Court denied the motion but the California Court of Appeals issued a writ of mandamus to the state of California telling them to quash the summons. The California Supreme Court reversed this decision, leading Asahi to appeal to the United States Supreme Court.

Holding
The Supreme Court applied a five-factor test in determining whether "traditional notions of fair play" would permit the assertion of personal jurisdiction over a foreign (meaning out-of-state) defendant:
What is the burden on the defendant?
What are the interests of the forum state in the litigation?
What is the interest of the plaintiff in litigating the matter in that state?
Does the allowance of jurisdiction serve interstate efficiency?
Does the allowance of jurisdiction serve interstate policy interests?

The Court found that in this case, the burden on the defendant was severe based on both the geographic distance and legal dissimilarities between Japan and the United States. Cheng Shin was not a California resident, diminishing California's interest in the case. Cheng Shin also did not show that it would be inconvenienced if the case for indemnification against Asahi were heard in Japan or Taiwan instead of California. Finally, neither interstate efficiency nor interstate policy interests would be served by finding jurisdiction.

Because an assertion of jurisdiction would disturb the "traditional notions of fair play and substantial justice," the decision of the California Supreme Court was reversed and the judgment of California Court of Appeal (California's intermediate appellate court) was effectively reinstated.

See also 
 International trade
 Comity
 Trade treaties

See also
 List of United States Supreme Court cases, volume 480
 List of United States Supreme Court cases
 Lists of United States Supreme Court cases by volume
 List of United States Supreme Court cases by the Rehnquist Court

External links
 
Asahi Metal Industry Co. v. Superior Court
Supreme Court of the United States

United States Supreme Court cases
United States personal jurisdiction case law
1987 in United States case law
United States Supreme Court cases of the Rehnquist Court